Naso vlamingii is a species of unicornfish in the surgeonfish family known by the common names bignose unicornfish, scibbled unicornfish, Vlaming's unicornfish, and zebra unicornfish.

Description
This is a relatively large member of the Acanthuridae, easily reaching 60 centimeters. The adult has tall dorsal and anal fins, vertical blue lines on its sides, and small blue spots dorsally and ventrally. A broad blue band extends from the eyes to the prominent snout. The coloration of the juvenile is a dingy green with blue spots and lips, later turning deeper blue with purple markings. The fish turns mud-brown while sleeping or when frightened, a form of camouflage.

Diet
This fish is mostly herbivorous but will eat small crustaceans such as copepods. In captivity brine shrimp and mysis shrimp. Most of its natural diet is algae.

Range
This tang is found in the Indo-Pacific oceans off the coasts of East Africa, on the islands of the Marquesas and Tuamotu, southern Japan and southern areas of the Great Barrier Reef. It is most often found in association with reefs and coastal lagoons, sometimes in small schools.

Economic value
Naso vlamingii has very little use to commercial fishers but is occasionally available in the marine aquarium industry, where it is a higher-priced, more uncommon tang.

References

External links
Froese, R. and D. Pauly, Eds. Naso vlamingii. FishBase. 2011.
 

Naso (fish)
Fish of Palau
Fish described in 1835